Hedmarken (known as Hedemarken  until 2003) is a traditional district in Innlandet county in Eastern Norway.

Hedmarken consists of the municipalities Stange, Hamar, Løten, and Ringsaker. In the past, it also contained the municipalities of Romedal, Vang, Furnes, and Nes, but those municipalities were merged into Hamar, Stange, and Ringsaker during the 20th century. Traditionally, it also included Gjøvik on the other side of the lake, but this is no longer the case. The old county of Hedmark was named after the district of Hedmarken, but the county included several other districts as well, namely Østerdalen and Glåmdalen (Solør, Odalen and Vinger).

The district is dominated by rolling agricultural terrain, hilly green mountains, and pine forests.

Etymology
The last element is mǫrk which means "woodland", "borderland", or "march". (See also Telemark and Finnmark.)

"In Hedmarken" is translated på Hedmarken which literally means "on Hedmarken".

History 
In the early Viking Age, before Harald Fairhair, Hedmarken was a petty kingdom, part of the Eidsivating. Kings of Hedmarken included:
 Halfdan Hvitbeinn
 Sigtryg Eysteinsson
 Eystein Eysteinsson, brother of Sigtryg
 Halfdan the Black, King Harald's father, was king of half of Hedmark after defeating rulers Sigtryg and his brother, Eystein.

References

Districts of Innlandet
Hamar
Løten
Stange
Ringsaker